ZCZ-011 is a positive allosteric modulator of the cannabinoid CB1 receptor.

See also 
 GAT100
 Org 27569
 PSNCBAM-1

References 

Cannabinoids
Tryptamines